Alfred O'Rahilly, KSG (1 October 1884 – 1 August 1969) was an academic with controversial views on both electromagnetism and religion. He briefly served in politics, as a Teachta Dála (TD) for Cork City, and was later the president of University College Cork. He also became a priest following the death of his wife.

Education and academia
Born (with the last name Rahilly) in Listowel, County Kerry, Ireland to Thomas Francis Rahilly of Ballylongford, County Kerry and Julia Mary Rahilly (née Curry) of Glin, County Limerick. 
He was first educated at St Michael's College, Listowel and at Blackrock College in Dublin.  O'Rahilly first earned University College Cork degrees in mathematical physics (BA 1907, MA 1908).

He studied scholastic philosophy at Stonyhurst College in Lancashire following his master's degree, then returned to UCC for a BSc (1912).  In 1914, he was appointed assistant lecturer in the Department of Mathematics and Mathematical Physics at UCC, and then in 1917 he was made Professor of Mathematical Physics.

In 1919 he received a doctorate from the Pontifical Gregorian University in Rome.  He became Registrar of UCC in 1920, and held the post until 1943 when he became President of the University. O'Rahilly founded Cork University Press in 1925.  He spent a year, in 1927, at Harvard studying social and political theory.

In 1938, he published a controversial book surveying electromagnetic theory called Electromagnetics (Longman, Green and Company), republished in 1956 by Dover as Electromagnetic theory, a critical examination of fundamentals.

In 1939, UCC conferred on him the degree D.Litt., and in 1940 the National University of Ireland awarded him a DSc.

The O'Rahilly Building was one of the major developments on the UCC campus in the 1990s and was named in honour of O'Rahilly.

Politics and public life
After the 1916 Easter Rising, O'Rahilly publicly supported Sinn Féin and was elected to Cork City Council as a Sinn Féin and Transport Workers candidate. Arrested early in 1921 for political writings, O'Rahilly was interned in Spike Island prison.

Released in October 1921 he was constitutional adviser to the Irish Treaty Delegation. O'Rahilly supported the Anglo-Irish Treaty and in 1922 he composed a draft constitution for the Irish Free State with Darrell Figgis.

O'Rahilly lead Irish delegations to the International Labour Organization conferences in 1924, 1925 and 1932, and took on a conciliatory role in trade union and employers disputes in Munster. As President of University College Cork, he initiated workers' education courses in the university in the late 1940s which proved popular with Cork trade unionists.

Standing as a candidate in Cork Borough for Cumann na nGaedheal, he was elected to the 4th Dáil at the 1923 general election. He resigned in 1924, causing a by-election later that year which was won by the Cumann na nGaedheal candidate Michael Egan.

Religion
A deeply religious Catholic from early life, O'Rahilly was a member of the Society of Jesus but left before ordination and was dispensed from his vows. He maintained his (sometimes controversial) religious views throughout his life, and became a priest, and then Monsignor, in later years following the death of his wife. He wrote a biography of Willie Doyle. He also contributed to The Irish Catholic weekly newspaper.

In 1954, Pope Pius XII conferred on him the Pontifical Order of Saint Gregory the Great.

He was also an advisor on university education to the Archbishop of Dublin John Charles McQuaid and sat on an informal committee from 1950.  The committee included O'Rahilly, and the other presidents of the National University of Ireland; Michael Tierney of UCD, Monsignor Pádraig de Brún, Cardinal D'Alton, and Bishops Cornelius Lucey of Cork and Michael Browne of Galway.

Science
In O'Rahilly's major survey of electromagnetic theory, Electromagnetics (1938), he opposed Maxwell's dominant (British) theory of the electromagnetic field and followed the French Catholic physicist, historian of science, and philosopher of science Pierre Duhem in rejecting Maxwell's field account. As a logical consequence of his rejection of Maxwell, O'Rahilly also rejected Albert Einstein's theory of relativity. O'Rahilly embraced Ritz's ballistic theory of light and Ritz's electrodynamics. While Ritz's theory reduces to Coulomb's Law and Ampere's Law, since its derivation is phenomenological, it differs from the Liénard–Wiechert potential.  O'Rahilly also wrote against applying the theory of evolution to human society.

Because O'Rahilly thought Cork lacked a social science curriculum he volunteered to teach courses in economics and sociology. When told that they could not spare him from the physics courses, he volunteered to teach an economics course and sociology course along with his physics courses.

Family 
His brother T. F. O'Rahilly was a Celtic languages scholar and academic, noted for his contribution to the fields of historical linguistics and Irish dialects. His sister Cecile O'Rahilly was also a Celtic scholar, and published editions of both recensions of the Táin Bó Cúailnge and worked with her brother in the School of Celtic Studies at the Dublin Institute for Advanced Studies.

His first cousin The O'Rahilly was one of the founding members of the Irish Volunteers and died in the Easter Rising.

Writings 
O'Rahilly's writings include: Father William Doyle, S.J. (1920, 4th ed. 1930), Flour, Wheat and Tariffs (1928), Money (1941), Jewish Burial: The Burial of Christ (1941), Religion and Science (1948), Aquinas versus Marx (1948), Moral Principles (1948), Social Principles (1948), The Family at Bethany (1949), Moral and Social Principles (1955), Gospel Meditations (1958) and Electromagnetic Theory (2 vols, 1965).

Father William Doyle S.J. (1922)
Electromagnetics: A Discussion of Fundamentals (1938)

References

External links

 Denis O'Sullivan, ed., Social Commitment and Adult Education: Essays in Honor of Alfred O'Rahilly as an Irish Adult Educator (Cork University Press, 1989)
 UCD Archives – Papers of Alfred O'Rahilly
 Alfred O'Rahilly in Humphry's Family Tree
 
 

1884 births
1969 deaths
Presidents of University College Cork
Alumni of University College Cork
Cumann na nGaedheal TDs
20th-century Irish Jesuits
Knights of St. Gregory the Great
Local councillors in Cork (city)
Members of the 4th Dáil
People educated at Blackrock College
People educated at St Michael's College, Listowel
Politicians from County Kerry
Relativity critics